Bjarne Øverhaug (3 November 1927 – 20 August 1996) was a Norwegian journalist and politician for the Labour Party.

He served as a deputy representative to the Parliament of Norway from Hedmark during the terms 1969–1973 and 1973–1977. In total he met during 16 days of parliamentary session. He resided in Tynset and was a journalist in Hamar Arbeiderblad.

References

1927 births
1996 deaths
People from Tynset
Deputy members of the Storting
Labour Party (Norway) politicians
Hedmark politicians
20th-century Norwegian journalists